The 2015–16 DFB-Pokal was the 73rd season of the annual German football cup competition. Sixty-four teams participated in the competition, including all teams from the previous year's Bundesliga and the 2. Bundesliga. It began on 7 August 2015 with the first of six rounds and ended on 21 May 2016 with the final at the Olympiastadion in Berlin, a nominally neutral venue, which has hosted the final since 1985. The DFB-Pokal is considered the second-most important club title in German football after the Bundesliga championship. The DFB-Pokal is run by the German Football Association (DFB).

The defending champions were Bundesliga side VfL Wolfsburg, after they beat Borussia Dortmund 3–1 in the previous final on 30 May 2015. They were knocked out of the competition in the second round by record title-holders Bayern Munich, losing 1–3. The Bavarians ultimately progressed to the final where it defeated Borussia Dortmund 4–3 on penalties, as the match finished 0–0 after extra time, to win their eighteenth title, and third in four years.

The winner of the DFB-Pokal earns automatic qualification to the 2016–17 UEFA Europa League group stages. However, as Bayern Munich already qualified for the UEFA Champions League via their league position, Mainz 05, the sixth placed team in the 2015–16 Bundesliga took this Europa League place, and Mainz's Europa League third qualifying round spot went to Hertha BSC. As Bayern Munich won the Bundesliga and DFB-Pokal, completing a double, Borussia Dortmund, the runners-up of the Bundesliga will host the 2016 DFL-Supercup.

Participating clubs
The following 64 teams qualified for the competition:

Map

Format

Participation
The DFB-Pokal began with a round of 64 teams. The 36 teams of the Bundesliga and 2. Bundesliga, along with the top 4 finishers of the 3. Liga were automatically qualified for the tournament. Of the remaining slots, 21 were given to the cup winners of the regional football associations, the Verbandspokal. The 3 remaining slots were given to the three regional associations with the most men's teams, which at the rime were Bavaria, Lower Saxony, and Westphalia. The runner-up of the cup for Lower Saxony was given the slot. The best amateur team of the Regionalliga Bayern and Oberliga Westfalen were given the slot for Bavaria and Westphalia, respectively. As every team was entitled to participate in local tournaments which qualified for the association cups, every team could in principle compete in the DFB-Pokal. Reserve teams were not permitted to enter. No two teams of the same association or corporation could participate in the DFB-Pokal.

Draw
The draws for the different rounds were conducted as following:

For the first round, the participating teams were split into two pots of 32 teams each. The first pot contained all teams which had qualified through their regional cup competitions, the best four teams of the 3. Liga, and the bottom four teams of the 2. Bundesliga. Every team from this pot was drawn to a team from the second pot, which contained all remaining professional teams (all the teams of the Bundesliga and the remaining fourteen 2. Bundesliga teams). The teams from the first pot were set as the home team in the process.

The two-pot scenario also applied for the second round, with the remaining 3. Liga and/or amateur team(s) in the first pot and the remaining Bundesliga and 2. Bundesliga teams in the other pot. Once again, the 3. Liga and/or amateur team(s) served as hosts. This time the pots did not have to be of equal size though, depending on the results of the first round. Theoretically, it was even possible that there could be only one pot, if all of the teams from one of the pots from the first round beat all the others in the second pot. Once one pot was empty, the remaining pairings were drawn from the other pot with the first-drawn team for a match serving as hosts.

For the remaining rounds other than the final, the draw was conducted from just one pot. Any remaining 3. Liga and/or amateur team(s) were the home team if drawn against a professional team. In every other case, the first-drawn team served as hosts.

Match rules
Teams met in one game per round. A match took place for 90 minutes, with two halves of 45 minutes. If still tied after regulation, 30 minutes of extra time were played, consisting of two periods of 15 minutes. If the score was still level after this, the match was decided by a penalty shoot-out. A coin toss decided who took the first penalty.

Cards
If a player received five yellow cards, even throughout multiple seasons, he was then banned from the next cup match. If a player received a second yellow card, they were banned from the next cup match. If a player received a red card, they were banned a minimum of one match, but more could be added by the German Football Association.

Champion qualification
The winner of the DFB-Pokal earns automatic qualification for the group stage of next year's edition of the UEFA Europa League. As winners Bayern Munich had already qualified for the UEFA Champions League by winning the Bundesliga, the spot went to the team in sixth, Mainz 05, and the league's second qualifying round spot went to the team in seventh, Hertha BSC. As Bayern won both the Bundesliga and the DFB-Pokal, completing a double, the runner-up of the Bundesliga, Borussia Dortmund, hosted the 2016 DFL-Supercup at the start of the next season.

Schedule

The rounds of the 2015–16 competition were scheduled as follows:

Matches
A total of sixty-three matches took place, starting with the first round on 7 August 2015 and culminating with the final on 21 May 2016 at the Olympiastadion in Berlin.

First round
The draw for the first round was held on 10 June 2015. Former national team player Karlheinz Förster led the draw, with tennis player Andrea Petkovic drawing from the pots.

The thirty-two matches took place from 7 to 10 August 2015.

As usual, a small number of lower-division teams had to play their home matches at different locations than their usual home grounds. This includes TuS Erndtebrück, who had to play in the Leimbachstadion in Siegen, Bremer SV, who had to switch to the Sportpark am Vinnenweg in Bremen, and FC Nöttingen, who had to play in the Wildparkstadion in Karlsruhe.

All times are CEST (UTC+2).

Second round
The draw for the second round was held on 14 August 2015. Then DFB president Wolfgang Niersbach led the draw, with skier Felix Neureuther drawing from the pots.

The sixteen matches took place on 27 and 28 October 2015. The lowest ranked team left in the competition was SSV Reutlingen from the fifth tier of German football.

All times are CET (UTC+1).

Round of 16
The draw for the round of 16 was held on 1 November 2015. DFB general secretary Helmut Sandrock led the draw, with musician Vanessa Mai drawing from the pot.

The eight matches took place on 15 and 16 December 2015. The lowest ranked team left in the competition was SpVgg Unterhaching from the fourth tier of German football.

All times are CET (UTC+1).

Quarter-finals
The draw for the quarter-finals was held on 16 December 2015. DFB general secretary Helmut Sandrock led the draw, with handballer Carsten Lichtlein drawing from the pot.

The four matches took place on 9 and 10 February 2016. The lowest ranked teams left in the competition were VfL Bochum and 1. FC Heidenheim from the second tier of German football.

All times are CET (UTC+1).

Semi-finals
The draw for the semi-finals was held on 10 February 2016. DFB vice-president Peter Frymuth led the draw, with handballer Andreas Wolff drawing from the pot.

The two matches took place on 19 and 20 April 2016. All remaining teams left in the competition were from the first tier of German football.

All times are CEST (UTC+2).

Final

The final took place on 21 May 2016 at the Olympiastadion in Berlin.

Bracket
The following is the bracket which the DFB-Pokal resembled. Numbers in parentheses next to the match score represent the results of a penalty shoot-out.

Top goalscorers
The following are the top scorers of the DFB-Pokal, sorted first by number of goals, and then alphabetically if necessary. Goals scored in penalty shoot-outs are not included.

Broadcasting rights
In Germany, all matches and the "conference" were broadcast live on pay TV via Sky Sport. Selected matches from the first round to the quarter-finals were broadcast on free TV by Das Erste from ARD. Both semi-final matches and the final were broadcast by both Sky Sport and Das Erste.

The following matches were broadcast live on free German television channel Das Erste:

Prize fund
Each participating team received a reward from the TV money and from the central promotional marketing (TV, stadium, and sleeve advertising) by the DFB. It was distributed as about €50 million to the 64 participants of the competition from 2015 to 2016. For wearing the sleeve advertising each participant received, according to the implementing provisions of the DFB-Pokal, €10,000 per game and round.

Notes

References

External links
 
DFB-Pokal on kicker.de 

2015-16
2015–16 in German football cups